Upton is a neighborhood in Baltimore City, Maryland, United States. The neighborhood is in the western section of the city, roughly between Fremont Avenue and McCulloh Street, extending from Dolphin Street to Bloom Street. Its principal thoroughfare is Pennsylvania Avenue.

Located within the Old West Baltimore Historic District, Upton has historically been one of the economic, political and cultural centers of the city's black community. In the early 21st century, it is the focus of the city's urban revitalization programs.

History

At the turn of the 20th century, Upton was one of the most affluent African American neighborhoods in the United States. The Pennsylvania Avenue commuter rail station on the Baltimore and Potomac Rail Road was built in 1884. By the 1920s, Upton was home to most educated African-American property owners in Baltimore. To its south and west were the poor and working class African-American neighborhoods of "The Bottom," and to its east were German-American and Jewish-American neighborhoods.

Pennsylvania Avenue was the premiere shopping strip for black Baltimoreans, inspiring comparisons to Lenox Avenue in Harlem. It was home to professionals such as doctors and lawyers, retailers who served a middle class and upscale clientele, jazz clubs, dance halls, theaters, and other public and private institutions for the black community. Cab Calloway grew up in Upton, and Eubie Blake performed his debut in a club on Pennsylvania Avenue. The Royal Theater, at Pennsylvania and Lafayette, became a mainstay on the Chitlin Circuit.

Upton was a base for much of the local and national civil rights movement. Booker T Washington, W. E. B. Du Bois, and Marcus Garvey all visited local churches. The Baltimore chapter of the NAACP was based in Upton when it was developed.

In the mid-20th century, Upton's population swelled due to the popularity of the neighborhood and the pressures of state racial segregation that kept African Americans confined to certain areas in the city. Single family homes were subdivided into small apartments, and Pennsylvania Avenue's sidewalks were crowded on Saturday nights. Loud music and heavy drinking became popular vices of the newer Upton residents. Upper-income black families began abandoning the area for neighborhoods away from the center of the city, as part of the suburbanization under way in many cities.

In the 1960s and '70s, controversial urban renewal projects destroyed much of Upton's historic architecture, especially in the southwestern portion of the neighborhood. The city constructed public housing projects to accommodate more people but did not replace all the units that were lost. In addition, once the historic buildings were razed, it was difficult to secure developers to build new construction. The Royal Theater was demolished in 1971.

A statue of Billie Holiday, a native of Baltimore, and a frequent performer at the Royal Theatre, is located at 1400 Pennsylvania Avenue. It was unveiled in 1985.

Marble Hill

The eastern section of the neighborhood, relatively untouched by urban renewal, was declared a national historic district in 1985. This area is today known as Marble Hill. It contains many historic rowhouses of the Queen Anne and Italianate styles, featuring high ceilings, decorative ironwork, and white marble steps.

Transportation
Upton is about a fifteen-minute walk from Downtown Baltimore. It is served by the Baltimore Metro Subway with the Upton/Avenue Market Metro Subway Station underneath the corners of Pennsylvania and Laurens Street. Bus Route 7 runs along Pennsylvania Avenue, and Routes 5 and 21 run near the neighborhood.

Upton in the 21st century

The Avenue Market sells produce and holds occasional events such as jazz shows. According to the city, 60% of Upton families with children under 5 are living in poverty. The median home sale price in Upton in 2004 (not including Marble Hill) was $28,054. Many of the rowhouses in the neighborhood are vacant, either abandoned by their property owners or owned by the city.

See also
List of Baltimore neighborhoods

References

External links
Marble Hill Community Association
Upton Planning Committee
Upton's Marble Hill Historic District – Baltimore Commission for Historical and Architectural Preservation
Master Plan for Upton, City of Baltimore, September 2005
Upton Neighborhood Profile – Live Baltimore
Baltimore '68: Riots and Rebirth

 
Neighborhoods in Baltimore
Historic districts in Baltimore